Alum Springs may refer to:

 Alum Springs, Virginia, an unincorporated community in Pulaski County, Virginia
 Alum Springs, West Virginia, a ghost town in Greenbrier County, West Virginia